Caterina Martinelli (c. 1589-1608) was an Italian opera singer, who was employed by Duke Vincenzo I of Mantua from 1603 until her death in 1608.

The title role in Claudio Monteverdi's opera L'Arianna was written for Martinelli, but she died prior to its premier.

Life
Martinelli was born in Rome in 1589. In 1603, she came to Mantua at the request of Duke Vincenzo, who originally intended for her to be trained in Florence first but later changed his mind. After arriving in Mantua, she lived in Monteverdi's household.

While little is known about her life after she arrived in Mantua, it is presumable that she sang regularly at the court and that Monteverdi wrote many pieces of music for her. Until her death, she was the Duke's preferred soprano in the court.

Martinelli died of small pox on March 9, 1608. The Duke had a marble tomb built for her and ordered that Carmelite Priests should celebrate Mass and Offices in her memory every year on the anniversary of her death. At the request of the Duke, Monteverdi composed a setting of a sestina written in her memory by Scipione Agnelli, a Mantuan bishop.

References

Italian operatic sopranos
1608 deaths
Year of birth uncertain
17th-century Italian women opera singers
Singers from Rome
Deaths from smallpox
Infectious disease deaths in Italy